Donatus Ó Fidabra OCist  was an archbishop in Ireland during the 13th-century.

The Prior of Louth,  he became Bishop of Clogher in 1218. In 1227 he became Archbishop of Armagh. Ó Fidabra died in October 1237.

References

13th-century Roman Catholic bishops in Ireland
Pre-Reformation bishops of Clogher
1237 deaths
Archbishops of Armagh